The Promise is a 1995 German-language film directed by Margarethe von Trotta. It was an international co-production between Germany, France and Switzerland. Two young lovers in Berlin are separated when the Berlin wall goes up, and their stories intertwine during the three decades to German reunification. This film was chosen as Germany's official submission to the 67th Academy Awards for Best Foreign Language Film, but did not receive a nomination.

Cast
Corinna Harfouch: Sophie
Meret Becker: young Sophie
August Zirner: Konrad
Anian Zollner: young Konrad
Jörg Meister: Alexander, 20 years of age
Tina Engel: Sophie's aunt
Monika Hansen: Sophie's mother
Klaus Piontek: Sophie's stepfather
Ruth Glöss: Konrad's granny
Dieter Mann: Konrad's father
Simone von Zglinicki: Konrad's mother
Hans Kremer: Harald
Eva Mattes: Barbara
Susann Ugé: young Barbara
Hark Bohm: Müller
Otto Sander: Professor Lorenz
Anka Baier: Monika
Sven Lehmann: Max
Heiko Senst: Wolfgang
Ulrike Krumbiegel: Elisabeth

See also
 List of submissions to the 67th Academy Awards for Best Foreign Language Film
 List of German submissions for the Academy Award for Best Foreign Language Film

References

External links

Swiss drama films
German drama films
1990s German-language films
Films set in Berlin
1995 films
Films directed by Margarethe von Trotta
1995 drama films
Films scored by Jürgen Knieper
Films set in East Germany
Films set in West Germany
1990s German films